The Underwood Community School District is a rural public school district located in Underwood, Iowa. The first school in the district was built in 1863, in Downsville, IA. The school was moved to Underwood, IA in 1903 following the incorporation of the town and subsequent abandonment of Downsville. In 1926, the high school was founded. The district headquarters are in the elementary-middle school, while the high school is a separate building. The district, entirely in Pottawattamie County, serves Underwood and McClelland.

The school mascot is the eagles and the colors are royal blue and white.

In 2006, the original Middle School was torn down and a new building was constructed. as an addition to Underwood Elementary school. In 2014, Underwood High School saw a lot of significant remodeling.

Schools
The district operates three schools, all in Underwood:
 Underwood Elementary School
 Underwood Middle School
 Underwood High School

Underwood High School

Athletics
The Eagles compete in the Western Iowa Conference in the following sports:
Cross Country
 Boys' 4-time State Champions (1952, 1953, 1954, 1959)
Volleyball
Football
Basketball
 Girls' 2-time Class 2A State Champions (2003, 2004) 
Wrestling
 3-time Class 1A State Champions (1998, 1999, 2000) 
Track and Field
Golf
Soccer
Baseball
Softball

See also
List of school districts in Iowa
List of high schools in Iowa

References

External links
 Underwood Community School District
 

School districts in Iowa
Education in Pottawattamie County, Iowa